Oliva vidua, common name the black olive, is a species of sea snail, a marine gastropod mollusk in the family Olividae, the olives.

Description
The length of the shell varies between 28 mm and 70 mm.

This species was responsible for five fatal cases of neurotoxic food poisoning in Sabah, Malaysia.

Distribution
Oliva vidua is endemic to the tropical Indo-Pacific Ocean, occurring in the Mascarene Basin, the Bay of Bengal, the Philippines, Indonesia, Australia and New Guinea.

References

 Liu, J.Y. [Ruiyu] (ed.). (2008). Checklist of marine biota of China seas. China Science Press. 1267 pp.

External links
 
 Röding, P.F. (1798). Museum Boltenianum sive Catalogus cimeliorum e tribus regnis naturæ quæ olim collegerat Joa. Fried Bolten, M. D. p. d. per XL. annos proto physicus Hamburgensis. Pars secunda continens Conchylia sive Testacea univalvia, bivalvia & multivalvia. Trapp, Hamburg. viii, 199 pp.
 Ducros de Saint Germain A. M. P. (1857). Revue critique du genre Oliva de Bruguières. 120 pp
 Fischer von Waldheim, G. (1807). Museum Demidoff, ou, Catalogue systématique et raisonné des curiosités de la nature et de l'art: données à l'Université Impériale de Moscou par son excellence Monsieur Paul de Demidoff. Tome III. Végétaux et Animaux. Moscow: Imprimerie de Université Impériale de Moscou. 300 pp, 6 pls
 Marrat, F. P. (1870-1871). Monograph of the genus Oliva. In: G.B. Sowerby II (ed.), Thesaurus Conchyliorum, vol. 4 (29-30): 1-46

vidua
Gastropods described in 1798